Caveat is a 2020 Irish horror film written, directed and edited by Damian Mc Carthy in his feature directorial debut. It stars Jonathan French as Isaac, a drifter suffering from partial memory loss who accepts a job to look after a psychologically disturbed woman in a house on a secluded island. The film premiered at the IndieCork Film Festival in Ireland on 4 October 2020.

Synopsis
Amnesiac drifter Isaac is hired by his acquaintance and landlord Moe Barrett to look after his niece Olga, who will occasionally go catatonic with little to no warning, putting her at risk as she lives on a remote island. The job requires that Isaac be chained in a harness that restricts him to certain portions of the house. He learns from Moe that Olga's mother went missing after locking her husband in the basement. Olga's father went insane due to extreme claustrophobia and killed himself. At the house, Isaac finds that, when lucid, Olga roams around with a crossbow and an eerie toy rabbit with human-like glass eyes.

After experiencing supernatural phenomena, Isaac discovers Olga's mother's corpse hidden behind a wall in the basement using the rabbit doll as a dowsing rod, since it drums whenever anything hidden in the house is close by. Olga warns Isaac that Moe will not let him leave, revealing what Moe told her: Moe and her father were the ones who killed her mother, who enjoyed toying with her husband's claustrophobia. Moe also planned to kill his brother, but could not go through with it. He then hired Isaac, who lured Olga's father into the basement and locked him there. Isaac has Olga call Moe, who confirms the story.

Isaac frees himself from the harness by taking the key from Olga's mother's corpse. Olga shuts off the power then tries to kill Isaac, but goes catatonic. Taking advantage of her catatonic state in an opportunity to escape, he locks Olga in the harness but she manages to shoot his leg with the crossbow. Isaac regains his memory, which reveals that he was not responsible for her father's death, as he had second thoughts and had tried to warn him via a note that Moe discovered. Moe pushed Isaac off a balcony, but he survived with amnesia.

Isaac tries to escape through a crawl space and is stalked by Olga's mother. The passage leads to the part of the basement wall where he discovered her corpse, which he finds is still there. As he attempts to saw through the thin wall to get out, he notices that the corpse's head has slightly changed position. Moe arrives and sees Isaac through the hole on the basement wall. Olga shoots Moe with the crossbow, walks back upstairs, and locks the basement door. Suddenly, Moe hears Isaac through the intercom, announcing he is already out of the house by escaping through another crawl space. Olga's mother saws through the wall and stalks Moe in the dark.

Outside, Isaac frees a chained dog and finds Olga, standing at the doorway still in the harness.

Cast
 Jonathan French as Isaac
 Leila Sykes as Olga
 Ben Caplan as Moe Barrett, Olga's uncle
 Conor Dwane as Olga's dad

Production
Filming took place in West Cork, County Cork, Ireland. According to director Damian Mc Carthy: "My friend Sam White's family owns Bantry House where we filmed. Actually, the house was way too nice—it's so beautiful, for what we wanted for this film, so a lot of it is sets built outside."

The toy rabbit featured in the film was acquired via eBay by Mc Carthy, who "always had an interest in wind-up toys". It was stripped of its fur and sent to costume and prop builder Lisa Zagone, who finalised its design.

Release
Caveat premiered on 4 October 2020 at the IndieCork film festival, where it was the opening film. It went to screen at several other film festivals, most related to the horror genre, before releasing on Shudder on June 3, 2021.

The film was invited at 25th Bucheon International Fantastic Film Festival held in July, 2021 to compete in Bucheon Choice Features section.

Reception
The website's critics' consensus reads: "An effective spine-tingler despite clear budget constraints, Caveat suggests a deliciously dark filmmaking future for writer-director Damian Mc Carthy." On Metacritic, the film has a weighted average score of 60 out of 100 based on seven critic reviews, indicating "mixed or average reviews".

Sheila O'Malley of RogerEbert.com gave the film a score of three out of four stars, calling it "an impressive and often terrifying film [...] and a reminder of how much can be done on a low budget if one is inventive enough". Noel Murray, in his review of the film for the Los Angeles Times, complimented Mc Carthy's perceived confidence as a director, and compared the film to "a gothic horror tone poem, with pungent notes of decay." Guy Lodge, writing for Variety, called the film "more intriguing than it is rewarding," but wrote that "there's enough tingly, tightly-budgeted atmosphere and witty genre gumption [...] to make one wonder what Mc Carthy could do on a looser, more expensive leash." Leslie Felperin of The Guardian gave the film 3/5 stars, writing: " plays a fancy cinematic game of hide the lady, swishing the narrative cards around adeptly and finding fresh ways to imbue the material with an incrementally increasing sense of unease."

References

External links
 
 

2020 horror thriller films
Irish horror thriller films
2020 psychological thriller films
Films set on islands
Films shot in County Cork
English-language Irish films
2020s English-language films